Shirkuh Rural District is in the Central District of Taft County, Yazd province, Iran. At the National Census of 2006, its population was 1,720 in 632 households. There were 1,309 inhabitants in 573 households at the following census of 2011. At the most recent census of 2016, the population of the rural district was 1,045 in 420 households. The largest of its 30 villages was Tezerjan, with 355 people.

References 

Taft County

Rural Districts of Yazd Province

Populated places in Yazd Province

Populated places in Taft County